Leptospermum polyanthum is a rigid, spreading shrub or small tree that is endemic to New South Wales. It has thin, rough bark, young stems that are hairy at first, elliptical leaves, relatively small white flowers and fruit are shed when the seeds are mature.

Description
The bark on older stems is thin and rough, often furrowed or flaky, the younger stems have silky hairs at first. There are a few reddish-brown bracts and bracteoles at the base of the young flower buds but are soon shed.

Taxonomy and naming
Leptospermum polyanthum was first formally described in 1989 by Joy Thompson in the journal Telopea, based on plant material collected by Ernest Constable near the Nepean Dam near Bargo in 1953. The specific epithet (polyanthum) refers to the large number of flowers produced on the flowering stems.

Distribution and habitat
This tea-tree grows on rocky escarpments on rocky gullies near streams and is found south of the Warrumbungles and Armidale district and along the coast and tablelands to the Wombeyan Caves.

References

polyanthum
Myrtales of Australia
Flora of New South Wales
Plants described in 1989
Taxa named by Joy Thompson